Hande Mehan (born 22 December 1995) is a Turkish musician and songwriter. Mehan, who had become a producer for Cem Adrian after meeting him during her university years, started her own music career the song "Sen Beni Güzel Hatırla", which was written and composed by herself.

Life 
Mehan was born on 22 December 1995 in Diyarbakır. She officially started her music career on 17 May 2018 by releasing the song "Sen Beni Güzel Hatırla" on YouTube. Later, together with Cem Adrian, she voiced a cover version of İlhan Şeşen's song "Sen Benim Şarkılarımsın". Meanwhile, she started to make appearances as a guest artist during Cem Adrian's concerts.

In 2018, she performed at the Trakya Music Festival. She collaborated with Cem Adrian on a cover version of the song "Ah Bu Şarkıların Gözü Kör Olsun", which was included in the soundtrack of the movie Bizim İçin Şampiyon. The song was released as a single on 30 December 2018.

Discography 
Singles

 "Sen Beni Güzel Hatırla" (2018)
 "Benimle Yaşa" (2018)
 "Dudak Kenarı" (2018)
 "Adı Yok" (2018)
 "Kime Veda Ediyorsun?" (2018)
 "Bu Gece Benimle Kal" (feat. Bandtra) (2019)
 "Bir Yol Var" (2019)
 "Sessiz Boşluk" (2020)
 "Son Yürüyüş" (2020)
 "Yalan Değil" (2020)
 "Bir Kızıl Goncaya Benzer Dudağın" (2020)
 "Yalan Değil" (with Sezin Alkan) (2020)
 "Kırılsın Ellerim" (2021)
 "Dökül İçime" (2021)
 "Olamam" (2021)
 "Deniz Üstü Köpürür" (2021)
 "Unutursan" (2021)
 "Beni Böyle Sevme" (2022)
 "Mayıs" (with Mehmet Güreli) (2022)
 "Öyle Yalnız" (with Cem Adrian) (2022)
 "Sever Mi?" (with Mil Savior) (2022)
 "Adı Sarhoşluk" (2022)
 "Sevdim Seni Bir Kere" (with Cem Adrian) (2022)
 "Yalnızca Sitem" (with Taladro) (2022)
 "Zararını Seviyorum" (2022)

Featurings
 "Sen Benim Şarkılarımsın" (with Cem Adrian) (2018)
 "Ah Bu Şarkıların Gözü Kör Olsun" (with Cem Adrian) (2019)
 "Mesafeler" (with Hakan Tunçbilek) (2019)
 "Kum Gibi" (with Cem Adrian) (2019)
 "Bu Yollar Hep Sana Çıkar" (with Cem Adrian) (2019)

References

External links 
 

1995 births
Turkish women songwriters
Internet memes
Living people
People from Diyarbakır